The National Petroleum Reserve in Alaska (NPRA) is an area of land on the Alaska North Slope owned by the United States federal government and managed by the Department of the Interior, Bureau of Land Management (BLM). It lies to the west of the Arctic National Wildlife Refuge, which, as a U.S. Fish and Wildlife Service managed National Wildlife Refuge, is also federal land.

Inupiat live in several villages around its perimeter, the largest of which is Utqiaġvik, the seat of the North Slope Borough.

The NPRA is an ecologically very important area for arctic wildlife; For birds, it has been called "Heathrow at the top of the world" with more birds in the NPRA than in the Arctic Wildlife Refuge.

Ecological importance

The NPRA is an ecologically very important area, and human settlements are small and rare. For birds, it has been called "Heathrow at the top of the world" with more birds in the NPRA than in the Arctic Wildlife Refuge.  It contains Teshekpuk Lake, an important nesting ground for many species of migratory birds, including shorebirds and waterfowl. The NPRA supports more than a half million caribou of the Western Arctic and Teshekpuk Caribou Herds. The Western Arctic Herd calves in the Utukok, Kokolik and Colville uplands, while the Teshekpuk Herd calves in the areas surrounding Teshekpuk Lake. The highest concentration of grizzly bears in Alaska's Arctic, as well as wolverines, and wolves prey on the abundant caribou.

NPRA contains the headwaters and much of the Colville River, Alaska's largest river north of the Arctic Circle. The region's geology is unique in Alaska and most of the area remained glacier free throughout the last ice age.

History

The NPRA was created by President Warren G. Harding in 1923 as Naval Petroleum Reserve Number 4 during a time when the United States was converting its Navy to run on oil rather than coal. In 1976 the Naval Petroleum Reserves Production Act (NPRPA) renamed the reserve the "National Petroleum Reserve in Alaska" and transferred it from the Navy to the Department of the Interior. The 1980 Interior Department Appropriations Act directed the Bureau of Land Management (BLM) within the Department of Interior to conduct oil and gas leasing. Nevertheless, the area was left essentially as a wilderness until the late 1990s.

The NPRPA also contains provisions that apply to any exploration or production activities within areas "designated by the Secretary of the Interior containing any significant subsistence, recreational, fish and wildlife, or historical or scenic value".  Based on this authority, the Secretary in 1977 designated three Special Areas within the NPRA in which all activities were to "be conducted in a manner which will assure the maximum protection of such surface values to the extent consistent with the requirements of this Act for the exploration of the reserve." The Teshekpuk Lake Special Area was created to protect migratory waterfowl and shorebirds. The Colville River Special Area was created to protect the arctic peregrine falcon, which at that time was an endangered species. The Utukok River Uplands Special Area was created to protect critical habitat for caribou of the Western Arctic Herd. The Secretary of the Interior enlarged the Teshekpuk Lake and Colville River Special Areas in the Northeast NPRA Record of Decision of 1998.   In 2003, a committee of the National Research Council published a report that urged caution in granted oil and gas leases, in that that oil and gas extraction in the reserve may cause permanent and irreversible environmental damage. In 2004, the Secretary created the Kasegaluk Lagoon Special Area.

Between 1944 and 1981, the US government drilled and then abandoned about 137 wells in the reserve as part of an exploratory oil and gas program in order to obtain estimates and locations of reservoirs.  BLM operates the abandoned wells.   In 1998, after BLM had gone through a planning process to create an "Integrated Activity Plan/Environmental Impact Statement" for the Northeast area, the Secretary of Interior signed a Record of Decision (ROD), which opened 87 percent of this area to oil and gas leasing and the first leases were signed in 1999.  A ROD for the Northwest area was signed in 2004.   BLM began the planning process for the South in 2005.  The 2003 USGS survey had indicated the best prospects for large reserves were just east of Teshekpuk Lake - a Special Area in the Northeast and in 2006 the Bush administration attempted to lease land  in the habitat around Teshekpuk Lake.  Six conservation groups sued to prevent the leases and won.  The litigation forced BLM to create a new plan for the entire reserve.  The final ROD for the entire region, including the South, was signed by the Secretary in February 2013.

In March 2012, the Alaska House and Senate passed legislation urging the Bureau of Land Management to plug the abandoned wells from the US government exploratory program; the resolution said just seven wells have been properly plugged and reclaimed and that the wells are an eyesore and are harming the environment.

Oil and gas reserves

An assessment by the United States Geological Survey (USGS) in 2008 estimated that the amount of oil yet to be discovered in the NPRA is only one-tenth of what was believed to be there in the previous assessment, completed in 2002.  The 2008 USGS estimate says the NPRA contains approximately "896 million barrels of conventional, undiscovered oil". The reason for the decrease is because of new exploratory drilling, which showed that many areas that were believed to hold oil actually hold natural gas.

See also
 Arctic policy of the United States
 Arctic Refuge drilling controversy
 Natural resources of the Arctic

References

External links 
 

1923 establishments in Alaska
Bureau of Land Management areas in Alaska
Petroleum in Alaska
Industry in the Arctic
Protected areas established in 1923
Protected areas of North Slope Borough, Alaska
Naval Petroleum Reserve